Ali Magomedovich Alchagirov (born 29 June 1966) is a Russian professional football coach and former player. He made his professional debut in the Soviet Second League in 1982 for PFC Spartak Nalchik.

Honours
 Russian Premier League champion: 1995.
 Russian Premier League runner-up: 1992.

European club competitions
With FC Alania Vladikavkaz.

 UEFA Cup 1993–94: 2 games.
 UEFA Cup 2000–01: 1 game.

Notes

1966 births
Sportspeople from Nalchik
Living people
Soviet footballers
Russian footballers
Russian football managers
PFC Spartak Nalchik players
FC Dinamo Minsk players
FC Spartak Vladikavkaz players
Russian Premier League players
Association football midfielders
Association football defenders
FC Spartak Moscow players